Crosby Gray Henderson (12 May 1885 – 27 April 1970) was an English professional footballer who made 71 appearances in the Football League playing as a left back for Grimsby Town and Birmingham. He was on the books of Newcastle United without appearing for their first team, and played Southern League football for Brighton & Hove Albion and Luton Town.

Life and career
Crosby Gray Henderson was born on 12 May 1885 in South Hylton, which was then in County Durham. He was a younger child of Thomas Henderson, a blacksmith by trade, and his wife Frances. He was apprenticed as a ship plater, and played local football for Hylton Rangers and Hylton Star before joining Football League First Division club Newcastle United in May 1906. He continued working in the shipyards while with Newcastle, never played for their first team, and moved on to Grimsby Town of the Second Division in May 1908.

Henderson played 65 league games for Grimsby over two seasons, earning himself a reputation as a solid defender, but left the club when they failed to be re-elected to the Football League. He joined Birmingham, who had finished below Grimsby but whose application for re-election had been successful. He went straight into the starting eleven, but lost his place after six games, and the form, consistency and fitness of the young Frank Womack meant he never regained it.

At the end of the 1910–11 season, he left for Brighton & Hove Albion of the Southern League. Both Grimsby and Birmingham had used him at left back, but he was capable of playing on either side, and it was as a right back that he made his 12 appearances for Brighton. He was released at the end of the season, and joined Luton Town, whose local newspaper described him as "a big, strong and very steady fellow, and a good kick." He began the season in the first team, but fell out of favour, and in August 1913 he was reported to be advertising for an engagement.

Henderson married Ellen Appleton in 1909. He died in Sunderland on 27 April 1970 at the age of 84.

Career statistics

References

Sources
 
 
 

1885 births
1970 deaths
Footballers from Sunderland
English footballers
Association football fullbacks
Newcastle United F.C. players
Grimsby Town F.C. players
Birmingham City F.C. players
Brighton & Hove Albion F.C. players
Luton Town F.C. players
English Football League players
Southern Football League players